Francis Archer Branscombe (6 May 1889 – 14 April 1942) was a Scottish footballer who played mainly as an outside left. The majority of his career was spent at Partick Thistle where he played from 1908 to 1917, making 214 appearances in all competitions and scoring 50 goals; he appeared in the finals of the Glasgow Cup in 1914 and the Glasgow Merchants Charity Cup in 1916, but finished on the losing side in both. He had loan spells with Vale of Leven and Rangers during World War I – in the period of around six weeks he spent at Ibrox, he managed to score in five different Scottish Football League fixtures out of the seven he played in. In 1917 he left Scotland to work in the wartime munitions industry in Woolwich. He later played for amateur side Dunkeld and Birnham, facing Partick Thistle in the 1923–24 Scottish Cup; the Jags won the tie 11–0.

He had a trial for the Scottish League XI in 1910 and played in the Glasgow FA's annual challenge match against Sheffield in 1914.

Branscombe was involved in a fatal accident during a match on Christmas Day 1909 when he slipped on an icy surface in a challenge for the ball with James Main of Hibernian, striking the Scotland defender in the stomach with his boot with some force. Main died from his injuries the following day. The incident affected the form of 20-year-old Branscombe for some time.

References

1889 births
1942 deaths
Scottish footballers
Clydebank Juniors F.C. players
Partick Thistle F.C. players
Rangers F.C. players
Vale of Leven F.C. players
Scottish Football League players
Scottish Junior Football Association players
People from Dennistoun
Footballers from Glasgow
Association football outside forwards